The Canadian province of Quebec held municipal elections on November 3, 2013. Below are the results by region.

Bas-Saint-Laurent

Matane

Rimouski

Rivière-du-Loup

Saguenay–Lac-Saint-Jean

Alma

Dolbeau-Mistassini

Roberval

Saguenay

Capitale-Nationale

L'Ancienne-Lorette

Quebec City

Saint-Augustin-de-Desmaures

Mauricie

La Tuque

Shawinigan

Trois-Rivières

Estrie

Coaticook

Magog

Sherbrooke

Montréal

Baie-D'Urfé

Beaconsfield

Côte-Saint-Luc

Dollard-des-Ormeaux

Dorval

Hampstead

Kirkland

L'Île-Dorval

Montreal

Montréal-Est

Montreal West

Mount Royal

Pointe-Claire

Sainte-Anne-de-Bellevue

Senneville

Westmount

Outaouais

Gatineau

Abitibi-Témiscamingue

Amos

Rouyn-Noranda

Val-d'Or

Côte-Nord

Baie-Comeau

Sept-Îles

Nord-du-Québec

Chibougamau

Gaspésie–Îles-de-la-Madeleine

Gaspé

Les Îles-de-la-Madeleine

Chaudière-Appalaches

Beauceville

Lévis

Montmagny

Saint-Georges

Thetford Mines

Laval

Lanaudière

Joliette

L'Assomption

Lavaltrie

Mascouche

Repentigny

Saint-Charles-Borromée

Saint-Lin–Laurentides

Terrebonne

Laurentides

Blainville

Boisbriand

Deux-Montagnes

Grenville-sur-la-Rouge

Source:

Mirabel

Mont-Laurier

Rosemère

Sainte-Anne-des-Plaines

Sainte-Marthe-sur-le-Lac

Sainte-Sophie

Sainte-Thérèse

Saint-Eustache

Saint-Jérôme

Montérégie

Acton Vale

Beloeil

Boucherville

Mayor

Boucherville City Council
District 1 (Marie-Victorin) Councillor

District 2 (Rivière-aux-Pins) Councillor

District 3 (Des Découvreurs) Councillor

District 4 (Harmonie) Councillor

District 5 (La Seigneurie) Councillor

District 6 (Saint-Louis) Councillor

District 7 (De Normandie) Councillor

District 8 (Du Boisé) Councillor

Bromont

Brossard

Candiac

Chambly

Châteauguay

Cowansville

Granby

Huntingdon

La Prairie

Longueuil

Mont-Saint-Hilaire

Pincourt

Saint-Basile-le-Grand

Saint-Bruno-de-Montarville

Saint-Constant

Sainte-Catherine

Sainte-Julie

Saint-Hyacinthe

Saint-Jean-sur-Richelieu

Saint-Lambert

Saint-Lazare

Salaberry-de-Valleyfield

Sorel-Tracy

Varennes

Vaudreuil-Dorion

Centre-du-Québec

Bécancour

Drummondville

Victoriaville

February 21, 2016 by-election

See also
Municipal elections in Canada
Electronic voting in Canada
2005 Quebec municipal elections
2006 Quebec municipal elections
2009 Quebec municipal elections

References

 
2013